is a passenger railway station located in the city of Fussa, Tokyo, Japan, operated by East Japan Railway Company (JR East).

Lines 
Ushihama Station is served by the Ōme Line, and is located 8.6 kilometers from the starting point of the line at Tachikawa Station.

Station layout 
This station consists of a single ground-level island platform serving two tracks, with an elevated station building above the platform. The station is staffed.

Platforms

History
The station opened on 1 March 1943. With the privatization of Japanese National Railways (JNR) on 1 April 1987, the station came under the control of JR East.

Passenger statistics
In fiscal 2019, the station was used by an average of 4,475 passengers daily (boarding passengers only).

The passenger figures for previous years are as shown below.

Surrounding area
 Yokota Air Base
Fussa Park

See also
 List of railway stations in Japan

References

External links

JR East station information 

Railway stations in Tokyo
Railway stations in Japan opened in 1943
Fussa, Tokyo
Ōme Line